Nizovka is a rural locality (a village) in Komyanskoye Rural Settlement, Gryazovetsky District, Vologda Oblast, Russia. The population was 24 as of 2002.

Geography 
Nizovka is located 33 km northeast of Gryazovets (the district's administrative centre) by road. Oberikha is the nearest rural locality.

References 

Rural localities in Gryazovetsky District